Ha Tae-kwon (born 30 April 1975) is a badminton player from South Korea. Born in Jeonju, Jeollabuk-do, Ha started his career in badminton with the recommendation of Kim Dong-moon in elementary school. He made his international debut in 1992, and won his first Grand Prix title at the 1995 Canada Open. Ha three times competed in Olympic Games in 1996, 2000 and 2004, won a bronze medal in 2000 and a gold medal in 2004.

Career 
Ha made his first appearance in Olympic Games in 1996 Atlanta, competed in the men's doubles event partnered with Kang Kyung-jin. He and Kang reached the quarterfinals after beat Siripong Siripul/Khunakorn Sudhisodhi of Thailand and Jon Holst-Christensen/Thomas Lund of Denmark in the first and second round. In the quarterfinals they defeated by the Malaysian pair Yap Kim Hock/Cheah Soon Kit in straight games.

In 2000 Sydney, Ha qualified to compete in two events. Teamed-up with Chung Jae-hee in the mixed doubles, they finished their campaign in the second round, beat the Ukrainian Vladislav Druzchenko/Viktoriya Evtushenko and lost to eventual silver medalists Trikus Haryanto/Minarti Timur of Indonesia. In the men's doubles, he partnered with Kim Dong-moon. They had bye in the first round, beat Yap Kim Hock/Cheah Soon Kit of Malaysia and Ricky Subagja/Rexy Mainaky of Indonesia in the second and quarterfinals, lost to Tony Gunawan/Candra Wijaya of Indonesia in the semifinals, and won a bronze medal match against Choong Tan Fook/Lee Wan Wah of Malaysia.

In 2004 Athens, Ha competed in the men's doubles with Kim Dong-moon as a third seeded. They had a bye in the first round and defeated Robert Mateusiak/Michał Łogosz of Poland in the second. In the quarterfinals, Ha and Kim beat Zheng Bo/Sang Yang of China 15–7, 15–11.  They won the semifinal against Eng Hian/Flandy Limpele of Indonesia 15–8, 15–2 and defeated fellow Koreans Lee Dong-soo and Yoo Yong-sung 15–11, 15–4 to win the gold medal.

In 2005, he competed at the Sudirman Cup, and helped the national team win a bronze medal.

Ha graduated from the Wonkwang University. In 2008, he was coach of the national team, and in October of the same year he became the coach of Samsung Electro-Mechanics.

Achievements

Olympic Games 
Men's doubles

World Championships 
Men's doubles

Asian Championships 
Men's doubles

Mixed doubles

Asian Cup 
Mixed doubles

IBF World Grand Prix 
The World Badminton Grand Prix sanctioned by International Badminton Federation (IBF) since 1983.

Men's doubles

Mixed doubles

IBF International 
Men's doubles

Mixed doubles

References

External links 
European results
All England champions 1899-2007

1975 births
Living people
People from Jeonju
South Korean male badminton players
Badminton players at the 1996 Summer Olympics
Badminton players at the 2000 Summer Olympics
Badminton players at the 2004 Summer Olympics
Olympic badminton players of South Korea
Olympic gold medalists for South Korea
Olympic bronze medalists for South Korea
Olympic medalists in badminton
Medalists at the 2000 Summer Olympics
Medalists at the 2004 Summer Olympics
Badminton players at the 1994 Asian Games
Badminton players at the 1998 Asian Games
Badminton players at the 2002 Asian Games
Asian Games gold medalists for South Korea
Asian Games silver medalists for South Korea
Asian Games bronze medalists for South Korea
Asian Games medalists in badminton
Medalists at the 1994 Asian Games
Medalists at the 1998 Asian Games
Medalists at the 2002 Asian Games
Badminton coaches
World No. 1 badminton players
Sportspeople from North Jeolla Province